An anti-war play is a play that is perceived as having an anti-war theme.

Some plays that are thought of as anti-war plays are:
Peace (421 BCE) - by Aristophanes
The Trojan Women (415 BCE) - Euripides
Lysistrata (411 BCE) - Aristophanes
Journey's End (1928) - R. C. Sherriff
 The Silver Tassie (1929) - Seán O'Casey
 The Rumour by C.K.Munro 1929 at the Royal Court Theatre produced by Hilda Dallas
Post-Mortem (1930) - Noël Coward
For Services Rendered (1932) - Somerset Maugham 
The Trojan War Will Not Take Place (1935) - Jean Giraudoux
Bury the Dead (1936) - Irwin Shaw
Idiot's Delight (1936) - Robert E. Sherwood
Hooray for What! (1937)  
The White Disease (1937) - Karel Čapek
The Mother (1938) - Karel Čapek
Mother Courage and Her Children (1939) - Bertolt Brecht
Schweik in the Second World War (1943) - Bertolt Brecht
Nemesis (1944) - Nurul Momen
All My Sons (1947) - Arthur Miller
Andha Yug (1954) - Dharamvir Bharati
The Hostage (1958) - Brendan Behan
Oh, What a Lovely War! (1961) - Charles Chilton
US (1966) - collaboration 
Viet Rock (1966) - rock musical by Megan Terry 
Hair: The American Tribal Love-Rock Musical (1967) - Book and Lyrics by Gerome Ragni and James Rado, music by Galt MacDermot
 Botticelli (1968) - Terrence McNally
Bringing It All Back Home (1969) - Terrence McNally
The Watering Place (1969) - Lyle Kessler
The Night Thoreau Spent in Jail (1969) - Robert E. Lee & Jerome Lawrence
G. R. Point (1977) - David Berry
Wilhelm Reich in Hell (1987) - Robert Anton Wilson
No-No Boy (2010) - Ken Narasaki

See also
 List of anti-war songs
 List of anti-war films
 List of books with anti-war themes
 List of peace activists

Anti-war themes